Deborah Renshaw-Parker (born October 28, 1975) is a former NASCAR Craftsman Truck Series driver.

Background and family life
Renshaw grew up in Bowling Green, Kentucky and has two brothers. She raced and drove in several types of motor vehicles (motorcycles, ATVs, and eventually Legends cars). She attended a 1996 driving school for Legends at Charlotte and at performance driving schools in Charlotte and Atlanta in 1998. Renshaw graduated from Northwood University in 1997 with a bachelor's degree in Business and an Associate's Degree in Automotive Marketing. She began racing in the Late Model Stock class at Highland Rim Speedway finishing second the 1999 Rookie of the Year standings.

Pre-CTS
Renshaw first participated in NASCAR when she began racing in the NASCAR Dodge Weekly Series in 2000. In two seasons, she finished in the top 10 three times and also set a qualifying record when she won the pole at Riverview Speedway. She also became the first woman to ever lead a NASCAR sanctioned series at Nashville Fairgrounds Speedway in 2002. Later that summer, she gained the spotlight when some fellow drivers entered a car in a race for the sole purpose of finishing behind her so her car could be protested. She sat out the next two races but resumed the season and ended up finishing tenth in the race for the track championship.

According to the book Along For The Ride by Larry Woody (Chapter "Lap XIX: Women, Wendell and Willie"), "[Mark] Day admitted early on that he was not convinced that women belonged on a race track" but that his problem was not with Renshaw because she was female, instead because she was a "bad driver." The protest covered both Renshaw and her male teammate Chevy White. Woody noted that track promoter Dennis Glau had "gotten wind of the scheme prior to the race" and contacted NASCAR, who instructed him to disallow the protest. Her father Dan Renshaw, however, felt there was nothing to lose and allowed officials to search the engine. A minor violation was found and her car was declared illegal.

Renshaw would spend the 2002 season in the ARCA RE/MAX Series, where she finished in the top ten three times. However, during her tenure there, she was involved in an accident that claimed the life of fellow driver Eric Martin, another controversial event during her career.  After Martin had originally spun out during a practice session in Charlotte, he was alive and talking to his crew over the radio. Three cars that approached Martin's car were unaware that he was there because their spotters were not in the stands; however, they avoided Martin's car as it slowly rolled across the track and into the wall. 8 seconds after it came to rest Renshaw, also without a spotter, collided with him at full speed, causing Martin's death. The incident prompted the mandation of spotters whenever their driver was on the track in NASCAR and ARCA.

Craftsman Truck Series

Renshaw ran in 14 of the last 15 races of the 2004 NASCAR Craftsman Truck Series season, driving the #29 Ford F-150 for K-Automotive Motorsports. Although she finished no higher than 15th in any race, she became the first woman to ever lead a race in the series when she led one lap in the Darlington 200. Renshaw joined Bobby Hamilton Racing's driver development program in December 2004. Replacing Chase Montgomery in the #8, Renshaw became the first woman to ever attempt a complete schedule in one of NASCAR's three premier series, missing only one race in the 2005 season. She had two top-ten starts, the highest being 8th at Nashville Superspeedway in August. Her final position in the points standings was 24th.

Afterwards, Renshaw's future with Bobby Hamilton Racing (BHR) was unknown. BHR was forced to search for a replacement for EasyCare, who pulled out as the primary sponsor. Furthermore, the team announced Bobby Hamilton Jr. was going to run a limited schedule in the truck for the 2006 season, with Montgomery returning for the first race at Daytona; no plans for Renshaw were announced. Finally, on February 1, 2006, The Tennessean reported the pullout by EasyCare cost Deborah her ride at Bobby Hamilton Racing, which effectively ended her racing career. In November 2006, she married NASCAR crew chief Shawn Parker.

Motorsports career results

NASCAR
(key) (Bold – Pole position awarded by qualifying time. Italics – Pole position earned by points standings or practice time. * – Most laps led.)

Craftsman Truck Series

ARCA Re/Max Series
(key) (Bold – Pole position awarded by qualifying time. Italics – Pole position earned by points standings or practice time. * – Most laps led.)

References

External links

1975 births
ARCA Menards Series drivers
American female racing drivers
Living people
NASCAR drivers
Sportspeople from Bowling Green, Kentucky
Racing drivers from Kentucky
Racing drivers' wives and girlfriends
21st-century American women
Northwood University alumni